Gurabad may refer to:
 Gurabad, Kerman